Raisa Chebanika (born 5 July 1964) is a Moldovan-born Russian para table tennis player. She won the gold medal in the women's individual C6 event at the 2012 Summer Paralympics held in London, United Kingdom.

In 2021, she won one of the bronze medals in the women's individual C6 event at the 2020 Summer Paralympics held in Tokyo, Japan. She also won one of the bronze medals in the women's team 6–8 event.

References

External links
 

Living people
1964 births
Russian female table tennis players
Paralympic table tennis players of Russia
Paralympic bronze medalists for the Russian Paralympic Committee athletes
Paralympic medalists in table tennis
Table tennis players at the 2012 Summer Paralympics
Table tennis players at the 2020 Summer Paralympics
Medalists at the 2012 Summer Paralympics
Medalists at the 2020 Summer Paralympics
People from Ștefan Vodă District